Hatun Uchku (Quechua hatun big, uchku hole, pit "big hole" or "big pit", hispanicized spelling Jatun Uchco) is a cave with archaeological and paleontological remains in Peru. It was declared a National Cultural Heritage by Resolución Directoral No. 441/INC on May 23, 2002.

References 

 Cueva de Jatun Uchco Groupe Spéléo Bagnols Marcoule. Retrieved April 27, 2014.

Caves of Peru
Archaeological sites in Huánuco Region
Archaeological sites in Peru